Melise de Winter (born 18 February 1968) is a Dutch voice actress. She plays Disney's Minnie Mouse, Pinkie Pie in My Little Pony: Friendship is Magic, Mandy in Totally Spies! and Shin Chan in the Japanese anime Shin Chan.

Biography
Melise de Winter was born on 18 February 1968. After attending a dance academy in Arnhem, de Winter moved to Amsterdam. Since 2002, she has been working as a voice actress, mainly dubbing adverts and cartoons, but also providing the Dutch-language voiceovers for popular toys.

Filmography
Animation
Mickey Mouse Clubhouse - Minnie Mouse
My Little Pony: Friendship is Magic - Pinkie Pie
PAW Patrol - Zuma
Totally Spies! - Mandy, Phoebe, Normy, additional roles
W.I.T.C.H. - Elyon
Winx Club - Chimera

References

External links

 

1968 births
Living people
Dutch voice actresses